KKIM (1000 kHz) is a commercial AM radio station in Albuquerque, New Mexico, broadcasting a Christian talk and teaching radio format.  The station is owned by Robert Wilkins, through licensee Wild West Radio Corporation.  National religious leaders heard on KKIM include Chuck Swindoll, Charles Stanley, John MacArthur and David Jeremiah.  KKIM uses a brokered programming system, where hosts pay a fee for their time on the air and may use their shows to seek donations to their ministries.  KKIM's studios are located in Northeast Albuquerque.

By day, KKIM is powered at 10,000 watts non-directional.  But because 1000 AM is a clear channel frequency reserved for Class A KNWN Seattle and WMVP Chicago, KKIM must greatly reduce power to 53 watts at night to avoid interference.  The transmitter tower is on Arno Street SE near the Albuquerque International Sunport.Radio-Locator.com/KKIM

History
The station was originally a daytimer, required to go off the air at sunset. Since its earliest days, it has broadcast a Christian radio format. The original owner was Christian Enterprises, Inc.  In 1976, an FM station was added, KLYT 88.3 FM.

On September 23, 2014, American General Media sold KKIM and KERI in Bakersfield, California, to South Carolina-based Christian broadcaster Wilkins Radio. This gave Wilkins ownership of another station in the Albuquerque radio market, along with KXKS 1190 AM. The sale was consummated on December 31, 2014, at a price of $587,500.

Wilkins had briefly leased KXKS to Rock of Talk LLC which changed the format to sports talk on April 1, 2015. However this was discontinued in July.   KXKS began simulcasting KKIM until KXKS switched to Spanish-language Christian programming in September 2015.

References

External links

FCC History Cards for KKIM

KIM
Radio stations established in 1973
1973 establishments in New Mexico
KIM